This is a list of albums by Michel Legrand.

Selected discography

Albums
1954 I Love Paris
1955 Holiday in Rome
1956 Castles in Spain
1957 Bonjour Paris
1957 C'est magnifique
1958 Legrand in Rio
1958 The Columbia Album of Cole Porter
1959 Paris Jazz Piano
1959 The New I Love Paris
1959 Legrand Jazz
1960 Legrand Piano
1962 Strings On Fire (Philips Records)
1963 Michel Legrand Big Band Plays Richard Rodgers (Philips Records)
1964 Archi-Cordes
1964 Plays for Dancers (US release of Archi-Cordes)
1967 Violent Violins (UK release of Archi-Cordes)
1967 Cinema Legrand (MGM Records)
1968 At Shelly's Manne-Hole
1968 Si C'est Ça La Musique À Papa
1968 Je M'appelle Barbra (Columbia)
1974 Twenty Songs of the Century
1980 Atlantic City
1983 After the Rain
1993 Michel Plays Legrand
1995 Michel Legrand Big Band
2002 Michel Legrand by Michel Legrand
2013 Entre elle et lui (with Natalie Dessay)
With Stan Getz
Communications '72 (Verve, 1972)
With Lena Horne
Lena & Michel (RCA, 1975)
With Bud Shank
Windmills of Your Mind (Pacific Jazz, 1969)
With Sarah Vaughan
Sarah Vaughan with Michel Legrand (Atlantic, 1972)
With Frankie Laine
Foreign Affair (Columbia, 1958)
Reunion in Rhythm (Columbia, 1958)
With Melissa Errico 

Legrand Affair, (Ghostlight Records, 2019)

Filmography

Lovers Net (Les amants du Tage) (1954)
Continente perduto (orchestrated) (1955)
Charmants garçons (1958)
Le Triporteur (1958)
L'Amérique insolite (1958)
L'Americain se détend (1958)
Terrain vague (co-composer) (1960)
A Woman Is a Woman (Une femme est une femme) (1960)
The French Game (Le cœur battant) (1960)
Les Portes claquent (1960)
Lola (1961)
Cléo from 5 to 7 (Cléo de 5 à 7) (1961)
The Seven Deadly Sins (Les Sept péchés capitaux) (co-composer) (1961)
The Winner (Un cœur gros comme ça) (1961)
Retour a New York (1962)
Comme un poisson dans l'eau (1962)
Eva (1962)
Une grosse tete (1962)
My Life to Live (Vivre sa Vie: Film en Douze Tableaux) (1962)
Bay of Angels (La baie des anges) (1962)
L'Amerique lunaire (1962)
Histoire d'un petit garcon devenu grand (1962)
Le Joli Mai (1962)
Illuminations (1963)
Le grand escroc (1963)
L'Empire de la nuit (1963)
Love Is a Ball (1963)
The Umbrellas of Cherbourg (Les Parapluies de Cherbourg) (1964)
A Ravishing Idiot (Une ravissante idiote) (1964)
Band of Outsiders (Bande à part) (1964)
Fascinante amazonie (1964)
Les amoureux du France (1964)
La Douceur du village (1964)
A Matter of Resistance (La vie de château) (1965)
Quand passent les faisans (1965)
 (Tendre voyou) (1965)
Monnaie de singe (1965)
The Young Girls of Rochefort (Les Demoiselles de Rochefort) (1966)
Who Are You, Polly Maggoo? (Qui êtes-vous, Polly Maggoo?) (1966)
The Plastic Dome of Norma Jean (1966)
L'an 2000 (1966)
Gold and Lead (L'or et le plomb) (1966)
A Matter of Innocence (also known as Pretty Polly) (1967)
L'homme à la Buick (1967)
How to Save a Marriage and Ruin Your Life (1967)
Sweet November (1968)
The Thomas Crown Affair (1968)
Play Dirty (1968)
The Appointment (rejected) (1968)
Ice Station Zebra (1968)
Michel's Mixed Up Musical Bird (1968)
The Swimming Pool (La Piscine) (1968)
Castle Keep (1969)
The Happy Ending (1969)
The Picasso Summer (1969)
Pieces of Dreams (1969)
The Magic Garden of Stanley Sweetheart (1970)
Wuthering Heights (1970)
Donkey Skin (Peau d'Âne) (1970)
The Lady in the Car with Glasses and a Gun (La Dame dans l'auto avec des lunettes et un fusil) (1970)
The Go-Between (1971)
The Married Couple of the Year Two (Les mariés de l'an II) (1971)
Summer of '42 (1971)
Le Mans (1971)
 (La Poudre d'escampette) (1971)
A Few Hours of Sunlight (Un peu de soleil dans l'eau froide) (1971)
A Time for Loving (Also: Paris Was Made for Lovers) (1972)
La vieille Fille (The Old Maid) (1972)
Lady Sings the Blues (1972)
Portnoy's Complaint (1972)
Hearth Fires (Les feux de la Chandeleur) (1972)
One Is a Lonely Number (1972)
The Outside Man (Un homme est mort) (1972)
A Doll's House (1973)
The Nelson Affair (Also: Bequest to the Nation) (1973)
Story of a Love Story (1973)
The Hostages (Le gang des otages) (1973)
40 Carats (1973)
Cops and Robbers (1973)
Breezy (1973)
The Man Who Loved Cat Dancing (rejected) (1973)
The Three Musketeers (1973)
A Slightly Pregnant Man (L'Evenement le plus important depuis que l'homme marche sur la lune) (1973)
Our Time (1974)
F for Fake (1974)
Section spéciale (Special Section) (1975)
The Savage (Le Sauvage) (1975)
Sheila Levine Is Dead and Living in New York (1975)
Gable and Lombard (1976)
Ode to Billy Joe (1976)
Le voyage de noces (1976)
The Smurfs and the Magic Flute (La flute à six schtroumpfs) (1976)
Gulliver's Travels (1977)
The Other Side of Midnight (1977)
Routes to the South (Les routes du sud) (1978)
Mon premier amour (1978)
The Phoenix (1978)
Lady Oscar (1979)
Je Vous Ferai Aimer La Vie (1979)
The Fabulous Adventures of The Legendare Baron Munchhausen (Les fabuleuses aventures du légendaire Baron de Munchausen) (1979)
Atlantic City (1980)
The Hunter (1980)
The Mountain Men (1980)
Les Uns et les Autres (also known as Bolero) (1980)
Hinotori (co-composer) (1980)
Falling in Love Again (1980)
What Makes David Run? (Qu'est-ce qui fait courir David?) (1981)
Le Cadeau (1981)
Chu Chu and the Philly Flash (1981)
Your Ticket Is No Longer Valid (1982)
Slapstick of Another Kind (1982) (1982 cut)
La revanche des humanoides (1982)
Best Friends (1982)
The Gift (1982)
Yentl (1983)
Never Say Never Again (1983)
A Love in Germany (Un amour en Allemagne) (1983)
Secret Places (1984)
Love Songs (Paroles et musique) (1984)
Palace (1985)
Partir, revenir (1985)
Train to Hell (Train d'enfer) (1985)
Parking (1985)
Crossings (1986)
Sins (1986)
Casanova (1987)
Social Club (Club de rencontres) (1987)
Spirale (1987)
Switching Channels (1988)
Three Seats for the 26th (Trois places pour le 26) (1988)
Five Days in June (Cinq jours en juin) (1989)
Escape from Paradise (Fuga dal Paradiso) (1990)
Dingo with Miles Davis (1991)
Gaspard et Robinson (1991)
The Burning Shore (1991)
The Pickle (1993)
Ready to Wear (Prêt-à-Porter) (1994)
Angels in the Outfield (1994)
Les Misérables (1995)
Les Enfants de Lumière (1995)
Aaron's Magic Village (1997)
Madeline (1998)
Doggy Bag (1999)
Season's Beatings (La Bûche) (1999)
The Blue Bicycle (La Bicyclette Bleue) (2000)
And Now... Ladies and Gentlemen (2002)
Cavalcade (2005)
Disco (2008)
Oscar and the Lady In Pink (Oscar Et Le Dame En Rose) (2009)
La rançon de la gloire (2014)
The Guardians (2017)
The Other Side of the Wind (2018)
J'ai perdu Albert (2018)

Computer games
Torin's Passage (1994)

Television
with Coloratura Soprano Dame Julie Andrews Music Around the World (1969)
Brian's Song (1971)
Oum le Dauphin Blanc (1971)
The Adventures of Don Quixote (1973)
It's Good To Be Alive (1974)
Cage Without a Key (1975)
Michel's Mixed-Up Musical Bird (1978; an ABC Afterschool Special)
Once Upon a Time... Space (1981)
A Woman Named Golda (1982)
The Jesse Owens Story (1984)
Promises to Keep (1985)
As Summers Die (1986)
Once Upon a Time... Life (1986)
Not a Penny More, Not a Penny Less (1990)
La Montagna dei Diamanti (1991)
Once Upon a Time... The Americas (1991)
Once Upon a Time... The Discoverers (1994)
The Ring (1995)
Once Upon a Time... The Explorers (1997)
Songbird Sings Legrand (A Concert with Regine Velasquez) (2002)
Once Upon a Time... The Planet Earth (2008)

References

Discography
Legrand, Michel